Kess Van Oostrum (born July 5, 1963 Netherlands) is a Dutch cinematographer and ex-president of the International Federation of Cinematographers (2020–2020). He was formerly the president of the American Society of Cinematographers (2016–2020). During his life time he has accrued 60 film credits.

References

Dutch cinematographers
1963 births
Living people